Kyle Cimenti (born 5 November 1998), is an Australian professional soccer player who plays as a forward for Marconi Stallions.

Club career
After spending some time in the Western Sydney Wanderers youth setup, Cimenti signed for Sydney United 58 FC playing out the 2018 NPL NSW season. In October 2018 Cimenti first signed for NK Spansko later moving to NK Kustošija in 2019 in the Croatian HNL-2 second division .

Cimenti returned to Australia in 2020 and signed for Rockdale Ilinden FC were he scored 8 goals in 13 appearances over the course of the season. On 21 May 2021 he signed for A-League side Macarthur FC. He made his debut on 4 June 2021 against Wellington Phoenix FC. 

Cimenti signed with Sydney United 58 for the 2022 Men's NSW National Premier League season.

References

External links

1998 births
Living people
Australian soccer players
Association football forwards
Macarthur FC players
National Premier Leagues players
A-League Men players
Sydney United 58 FC players